Arthur Charles Cooper (May 1864 – 1 October 1921) was a member of the Queensland Legislative Assembly.

Biography 
Cooper was born in London, the son of Edward Henry Cooper and his wife Charlotte Maria (née Mills). He graduated from Trinity College, Dublin and went to South Africa where he served with Sir Charles Warren's Buchuanaland Expedition in 1884-1885 and with the Connaught Rangers against the Boer forces. He came to Queensland in 1886 and acquired Weewondilla Station at Longreach in  1889.

He returned to England in 1905, inherited a large fortune, and lived at Gissing Hall, Norfolk. He died in Norwich in October 1921.

Public life
Cooper, a Ministerialist, represented the seat of Mitchell from 1902 until he resigned in 1905 to return to England.

References 

Members of the Queensland Legislative Assembly
1864 births
1921 deaths